is a railway station in the city of  Ōsaki, Miyagi Prefecture, Japan, operated by East Japan Railway Company (JR East).

Lines
Kashimadai Station is served by the Tōhoku Main Line, and is located 386.6 rail kilometers from the official starting point of the line at Tokyo Station.

Station layout
The station has one ground-level side platform and one ground-level island platform connected to the elevated station building by a footbridge. The station has a Midori no Madoguchi staffed ticket office.

Platforms

History
Kashimadai Station opened on March 16, 1892. The station was absorbed into the JR East network upon the privatization of the Japanese National Railways (JNR) on April 1, 1987.

Passenger statistics
In fiscal 2018, the station was used by an average of 1,620 passengers daily (boarding passengers only).

Surrounding area

former Kashimadai Town Hall
Kashimadai Post Office
Kashimadai Rock Shopping Center

See also
 List of Railway Stations in Japan

References

External links

  

Railway stations in Miyagi Prefecture
Tōhoku Main Line
Railway stations in Japan opened in 1892
 Ōsaki, Miyagi
Stations of East Japan Railway Company